Sajawalpur is a village in Shaheed Bhagat Singh Nagar district of Punjab State, India. The village is administrated by Sarpanch an elected representative of the village.

Demography 
As of 2011, Sajawalpur has a total number of 220 houses and population of 1031 of which 531 include are males while 500 are females according to the report published by Census India in 2011. The literacy rate of Sajawalpur is 78.93% higher than the state average of 75.84%. The population of children under the age of 6 years is 82 which is 7.85% of total population of Sajawalpur, and child sex ratio is approximately 907 as compared to Punjab state average of 846.

Most of the people are from Schedule Caste which constitutes 39.38% of total population in Sajawalpur. The town does not have any Schedule Tribe population so far.

As per the report published by Census India in 2011, 333 people were engaged in work activities out of the total population of Sajawalpur which includes 321 males and 12 females. According to census survey report 2011, 48.95% workers describe their work as main work and 51.05% workers are involved in Marginal activity providing livelihood for less than 6 months.

Education 
KC Engineering College and Doaba Khalsa Trust Group Of Institutions are the nearest colleges.

List of schools nearby:
Govt Primary School, Sadhpur
Govt High School, Saidpur Kalan
Govt Senior Secondary School, Ladhana Jhikka
Govt High School, Jhander Kalan
Guru Ram Dass Public School, Cheta

Transport 

See also 
List of villages in India

References

External links 
 Tourism of Punjab
 Census of Punjab
 Locality Based PINCode

Villages in Shaheed Bhagat Singh Nagar district